Anderson Silva de França (born 28 August 1982), known as Anderson de Silva, is a Brazilian former footballer who played as a midfielder.

Career
His loan term at Everton was extended into the 2006–07 season, during which time Málaga were a lower-level Spanish Second Division side – about the equivalent of the Championship in England — in danger of being relegated and Da Silva was not even getting a game for their first team.

Eventually, after 18 months in limbo, he officially joined Everton on 2 January 2007.

He signed for Barnsley on a permanent basis for an undisclosed fee on 31 January 2008.

He played in the club's historic FA Cup win against Liverpool, before rupturing his anterior cruciate ligament in the following away game against Norwich City in late February, an injury which ruled him out for seven months.

He was released by Barnsley after the 2009/10 season.

References

External links
Anderson Silva de França profile at barnsleyfc.co.uk

1982 births
Footballers from São Paulo
Living people
Association football midfielders
Brazilian footballers
Naturalised citizens of Spain
Brazilian expatriate footballers
Expatriate footballers in England
Expatriate footballers in Spain
Expatriate footballers in Uruguay
Club Nacional de Football players
Montevideo Wanderers F.C. players
Racing de Santander players
Málaga CF players
Everton F.C. players
Barnsley F.C. players
C.A. Rentistas players
Uruguayan Primera División players
La Liga players
Premier League players
English Football League players